Shui Chuen O is one of the 41 constituencies in the Sha Tin District.

Created for the 2019 District Council elections, the constituency returns one district councillor to the Sha Tin District Council, with an election every four years.

Shui Chuen O loosely covers part of public housing estate Shui Chuen O Estate in Sha Tin. It has projected population of 20,294.

Councillors represented

Election results

2010s

References

Sha Tin
Constituencies of Hong Kong
Constituencies of Sha Tin District Council
2019 establishments in Hong Kong
Constituencies established in 2019